The West Technical College is a high school in Timișoara. It was founded in 1946 as a school for civil, industrial and agricultural constructions. It suffered numerous name changes since, but kept its profile as an industrial and construction-oriented institution. From 2018 onward, it is known as the West Technological High School. Currently, it is the only high school in Timiș County with a construction profile in which plumbers, masons, electricians, builders, carpenters, joiners and painters are trained.

The building that houses the high school is located in the site of historical monuments called Old Iosefin and was built in 1946 for school purposes. Between 2013 and 2017, the building also housed the city's High School of Fine Arts.

References 

Educational institutions established in 1946
Schools in Timișoara
1946 establishments in Romania
High schools in Romania